Antoine Kassis is a Lebanese chess player. He was awarded the title of FIDE Master in 2013.

Chess career
Kassis has represented Lebanon in a number of Chess Olympiads, including:
 1994, where he scored 3½/9 on board four.
 1996, scoring 4½/9 on first reserve.
 1998, scoring 6½/11 on first reserve.
 2002, scoring 5/10 on first reserve.
 2004, scoring 4/9 on board four.
 2006, scoring 5/9 on board three.
 2008, scoring 5½/9 on board three
 2010, scoring 4/10 on board four.
 2012, scoring 6/10 on board four.
 2014, scoring 5½/9 on board two
 2016, scoring 3/9 on board three.
 2018, scoring 3½/8 on board four.

He won the Lebanese Chess Championship in 1995, 2018 and 2019.

He qualified to play in the Chess World Cup 2021, where he was defeated 2-0 by Yuri Kuzubov in the first round.

References

External links 

Antoine Kassis chess games at 365Chess.com

1972 births
Living people
Lebanese chess players
Chess FIDE Masters